Tales in Space is an anthology of science fiction short stories edited by Peter Crowther. It was first published as a trade paperback by White Wolf Publishing in April 1998. It was issued as a companion to Three in Space from the same publisher; the two books followed up a similar pair, Three in Time and Tales in Time, published in 1997.

The book collects fifteen tales by various authors, together with an introduction by the editor.

Contents
 "Introduction" (Peter Crowther)
 "Walking on the Moon" (Allen Steel)
 "The Message from Mars" (J. G. Ballard)
 "Nine Lives" (Ursula K. Le Guin)
 "Visits to Remarkable Cities" (Ian McDonald)
 "The Dark Soul of the Night" (Brian W. Aldiss)
 "The Man who Hated Gravity" (Ben Bova)
 "Recording Angel" (Paul J. McAuley)
 "Pictures Don't Lie" (Katherine MacLean)
 "The Odor of Cocktail Cigarettes" (Ian Watson)
 "The Bone Flute" (Lisa Tuttle)
 "Dream Done Green" (Alan Dean Foster)
 "The Graveyard Cross" (Robert Holdstock)
 "Kaleidoscope" (Ray Bradbury)
 "Picnic on Nearside" (John Varley)
 "Schwartz Between the Galaxies" (Robert Silverberg)

Notes

1998 anthologies
Science fiction anthologies